Upper Orakzai is a National Assembly constituency situated in the Orakzai Agency in the Federally Administered Tribal Areas of Pakistan.

Some of main areas of Upper Orakzai include:

 Sampoga
 Ghotak Eisa khel
 Dabori
 Zanka khel
 Zakhtan
 Sama Mamoozi
 Arghunja
 Mir kalam khel
 Stara kada
 Swaro kot
 Ghiljo
 Kandi Mishti
 Khwaga seri/sarka
 Yakh kandow
 Buland Khel

References

Orakzai District
?
?